Charles René Magon de Médine (12 November 1763 – 21 October 1805) was a French contre-amiral killed at the battle of Trafalgar whilst commanding the ship-of-the-line Algésiras - his conduct in the battle is seen by French historians as one of the few redeeming features of that disaster, and his name appears on the Arc de Triomphe. He is also notable as a Grand Officer of the Masonic Grand Orient de France.

Life

Ancien Régime
From a noble family in Saint Malo, Magon became a garde marine in 1777. His father, the governor of the Mascarene Islands, died in 1778 and left his son his estate of Médine on Mauritius, from which Magon derived his full name. He fought at Ushant in 1778 on the ship of the line Bretagne before participating in the English Channel campaign on the Saint Esprit. Rising to enseigne de vaisseau in 1780, he served in the Antilles, on the Solitaire, in the comte de Guichen's squadron. He fought in three battles against Rodney's fleet off Dominica before serving in de Grasse's squadron on the Caton, fighting at the Chesapeake, St. Kitts and Les Saintes. He was captured and only freed at the end of 1782.

In April 1783 he set out for the Indian Ocean on the frigate Surveillante, and spent the next 15 years there. On 1 May 1786 he was promoted to lieutenant de vaisseau and in November 1786 he was put in command of the frigate Amphitrite, with which he recaptured Diego Garcia from the British. On his return he served as second officer of the frigate Driade then of the frigate Pandour, with which ships he served another 18 months in the seas off India and China.

French Revolution
In April 1788, he embarked as second officer of the Dryade, before taking command of the Minerve (June 1791), then the Cybèle (November 1792). As an aristocrat he was arrested at Port Louis but quickly released, becoming aide de camp to the comte de Malartic, governor general of the Mascarene Islands. Promoted to capitaine de vaisseau shortly afterwards, he then became the interim commander of French naval forces in the Indian Ocean (then amounting to 3 frigates and a corvette) until the arrival of contre-amiral Sercey's frigate division.

In January 1798, he took command of the Vertu and, alongside the Régénérée, then escorted a convoy of two Spanish ships of the line back to Europe. Arriving back in Europe, he was rewarded for his services by the Spanish, notably with a magnificent suit of armour, before taking his frigates on to Rochefort. On arriving back in Paris he had his property confiscated on being accused of colluding with Malartic in disallowing the French Directory agents Baco de la Chapelle and Burnel from applying the decree of 16 Pluviôse Year II on the abolition of slavery (revoked by the Law of 20 May 1802) but instead forcibly re-embarking them for France. Admiral Étienne Eustache Bruix won Magon's reappointment and a few months later Magon rose to chef de division.

At first employed in Paris in reorganising the navy, then in inspecting mainland France's ports, in 1801 he was put back into active service, at first on the ship of the line Océan, then on the Mont Blanc, the latter of which was part of the naval force under admiral Villaret for the Saint-Domingue expedition. Put in command of four ships of the line and two frigates and ordered to capture fort Dauphin, Magon did so so quickly and successfully that the expedition's supreme commander Leclerc immediately promoted him to contre-amiral, stating in his report "This nomination was on the army's unanimous wish, and I do not doubt that the government will confirm it" (as it did so in March 1802).

First Empire
In 1803, admiral Bruix summoned Magon to Boulogne to command the right wing of the flotilla for Napoleon's planned invasion of the United Kingdom. On 11 December 1803 he was made a member of the Légion-d'Honneur, rising to a commander in it on 14 June 1804. Napoleon ordered the flotilla to carry out an exercise and fleet review in the open sea. Magon considered this dangerous due to bad weather, but Bruix refused to excuse him from it. It proved a disaster as Magon had predicted, with a storm destroying 30 barges. In the months that followed Magon beat off several British attempts to destroy the flotilla.

In March 1805, Magon commanded a division at Rochefort that included the ships of the line Algésiras and Achille. He joined Villeneuve in the Antilles and commanded the rearguard in the Battle of Cape Finisterre (July 1805) against admiral Robert Calder's squadron. At Trafalgar the following October (Magon's twelfth battle, aged only 42), Magon was still on the Algésiras as part of the Spanish admiral Gravina's light squadron, which was attacked by Collingwood's squadron. The crew of the Algésiras was about to board the Tonnant when the Colossus and Bellerophon came to their admiral's aid. Magon was wounded by musket balls twice but remained at his post and led the fighting for five hours before finally being killed by a third such ball just before his vessel was itself boarded and captured.

Images 
 Geoffroy Dauvergne (1922–1977) was commissioned by the Mairie de Saint Servan (Saint Malo) to paint a portrait of Magon in 1960. Three versions of it exist - one in the Mairie de St Servan, one in the Musée de St Malo and one in a private collection.

Notes

Sources
 
  Thomazi (Auguste) : Les Marins de Napoléon, Tallandier, Paris 1978.
  Tulard (Jean) (sous la direction de) : Dictionnaire Napoléon, Librairie Arthème Fayard, Paris 1999
  Monaque (Rémi) : Trafalgar 21 octobre 1805, Tallandier, Paris 2005
  Dictionnaire des marins francs-maçons (ed. Jean Marc Van Hille), Éditions le Phare de Misaine, Nantes, 2008

External links
 magon

1763 births
1805 deaths
Military personnel from Paris
French military personnel killed in the Napoleonic Wars
French naval commanders of the Napoleonic Wars
Military leaders of the French Revolutionary Wars
French military personnel of the French Revolutionary Wars
French military personnel of the American Revolutionary War
French Navy admirals
Commandeurs of the Légion d'honneur
Names inscribed under the Arc de Triomphe